Muralyovo is a rural locality (a village) in Butylitskoye Rural Settlement, Melenkovsky District, Vladimir Oblast, Russia. The population was 2 as of 2010.

Geography 
Muralyovo is located 18 km north of Melenki (the district's administrative centre) by road. Vichkino is the nearest rural locality.

References 

Rural localities in Melenkovsky District